Hyde Park Corner is a shopping centre in Johannesburg, South Africa.

It is located in Hyde Park at the major intersection of Jan Smuts Avenue and William Nicol Drive. and was completed in November 1969 and built by Murray & Roberts Construction, now renamed Concor.

It was one of the first fully enclosed decentralised shopping centres in South Africa.

It houses permanent mosaic artworks by historically significant South African artists and hosts the yearly Rotary International Art Fair.

External links
 Official site

Buildings and structures completed in 1969
Shopping centres in Johannesburg
20th-century architecture in South Africa